Argyrotaenia glabra is a species of moth of the family Tortricidae. It is found in Chiapas, Mexico.

The colouration of the forewings varies, ranging from pale brown-yellow specimens with browner markings to yellow ferruginous almost monochrome individuals.

References

Moths described in 2000
glabra
Moths of Central America